A crest is any of various anatomical features appearing as a raised point or ridge, most prominently those on the head or back of an animal.

A part of a bone:
Sagittal crest
Cnemial crest
Iliac crest
Frontal crest
Infratemporal crest
Anterior lacrimal crest
Posterior lacrimal crest
Buccinator crest
A feature on various animals:
Crest (feathers)
Display feature or thermoregulatory feature in various reptiles
Sail (anatomy), also known as crest in some animals
The point of a horse's neck where the mane grows from
Neural crest, a temporary group of cells unique to vertebrates that arise from the embryonic ectoderm cell layer